Genesee (also Jenkinsville) is an unincorporated community located in the town of Genesee, Waukesha County, Wisconsin, United States. Wisconsin State Highways 59 and 83 intersect in Genesee.

Notes

Unincorporated communities in Waukesha County, Wisconsin
Unincorporated communities in Wisconsin